Antti-Jussi Kemppainen (born 21 July 1989) is a Finnish freestyle skier, specializing in halfpipe and slopestyle.

Kemppainen competed at the 2014 Winter Olympics for Finland. He placed 9th in the qualifying round in the halfpipe, advancing to the final. He finished 8th in the final, with a best run of 78.20 points.

As of April 2014, his best showing at the World Championships is 5th, in the 2013 halfpipe.

Kemppainen, who was born in Kuusamo, made his World Cup debut in January 2006. As of April 2014, he has one World Cup win, at Cardrona in 2013–14, and three other podium finishes. His best World Cup overall finish in halfpipe is 2nd, in 2006–07.

World Cup Podiums

References

1989 births
Living people
Olympic freestyle skiers of Finland
Freestyle skiers at the 2014 Winter Olympics
People from Kuusamo
Finnish male freestyle skiers
Sportspeople from North Ostrobothnia